The 14th Street–Union Square station is a New York City Subway station complex shared by the BMT Broadway Line, the BMT Canarsie Line and the IRT Lexington Avenue Line. It is located at the intersection of Fourth Avenue and 14th Street, underneath Union Square in Manhattan. The complex sits on the border of several neighborhoods, including the East Village to the southeast, Greenwich Village to the south and southwest, Chelsea to the northwest, and both the Flatiron District and Gramercy Park to the north and northeast.

The Lexington Avenue Line platforms were built for the Interborough Rapid Transit Company (IRT) as an express station on the city's first subway line, which was approved in 1900. The station opened on October 27, 1904, as one of the original 28 stations of the New York City Subway. As part of the Dual Contracts, the Broadway Line platforms opened in 1917 and the Canarsie Line platform opened in 1924. Several modifications have been made to the stations over the years, and they were combined on July 1, 1948. The complex was renovated in the 1990s and was placed on the National Register of Historic Places in 2005.

The Lexington Avenue Line station has two abandoned side platforms, two island platforms, and four tracks, while the parallel Broadway Line station has two island platforms and four tracks. The Canarsie Line station, crossing under both of the other stations, has one island platform and two tracks. Numerous elevators make most of the complex compliant with the Americans with Disabilities Act of 1990 (ADA). In 2016, over 34 million passengers entered this station, making it the fourth-busiest station in the system.

History

First subway 

Planning for a subway line in New York City dates to 1864. However, development of what would become the city's first subway line did not start until 1894, when the New York State Legislature authorized the Rapid Transit Act. The subway plans were drawn up by a team of engineers led by William Barclay Parsons, chief engineer of the Rapid Transit Commission. It called for a subway line from New York City Hall in lower Manhattan to the Upper West Side, where two branches would lead north into the Bronx. A plan was formally adopted in 1897, and all legal conflicts concerning the route alignment were resolved near the end of 1899. The Rapid Transit Construction Company, organized by John B. McDonald and funded by August Belmont Jr., signed the initial Contract 1 with the Rapid Transit Commission in February 1900, in which it would construct the subway and maintain a 50-year operating lease from the opening of the line. In 1901, the firm of Heins & LaFarge was hired to design the underground stations. Belmont incorporated the Interborough Rapid Transit Company (IRT) in April 1902 to operate the subway.

The 14th Street station was constructed as part of the route segment from Great Jones Street to 41st Street. Construction on this section of the line began on September 12, 1900. The section from Great Jones Street to a point 100 feet (30 m) north of 33rd Street was awarded to Holbrook, Cabot & Daly Contracting Company. By late 1903, the subway was nearly complete, but the IRT Powerhouse and the system's electrical substations were still under construction, delaying the system's opening. The 14th Street station opened on October 27, 1904, as one of the original 28 stations of the New York City Subway from City Hall to 145th Street on the Broadway–Seventh Avenue Line. The opening of the 14th Street station turned Union Square into a major transportation hub. With the northward relocation of the city's theater district, Union Square became a major wholesaling district with several loft buildings, as well as numerous office buildings.

Initially, the IRT station was served by local and express trains along both the West Side (now the Broadway–Seventh Avenue Line to Van Cortlandt Park–242nd Street) and East Side (now the Lenox Avenue Line). West Side local trains had their southern terminus at City Hall during rush hours and South Ferry at other times, and had their northern terminus at 242nd Street. East Side local trains ran from City Hall to Lenox Avenue (145th Street). Express trains had their southern terminus at South Ferry or Atlantic Avenue and had their northern terminus at 242nd Street, Lenox Avenue (145th Street), or West Farms (180th Street). Express trains to 145th Street were later eliminated, and West Farms express trains and rush-hour Broadway express trains operated through to Brooklyn.

To address overcrowding, in 1909, the New York Public Service Commission proposed lengthening platforms at stations along the original IRT subway. As part of a modification to the IRT's construction contracts, made on January 18, 1910, the company was to lengthen station platforms to accommodate ten-car express and six-car local trains. In addition to $1.5 million (equivalent to $ million in ) spent on platform lengthening, $500,000 was spent on building additional entrances and exits. It was anticipated that these improvements would increase capacity by 25 percent. Six-car local trains began operating in October 1910. On January 23, 1911, ten-car express trains began running on the Lenox Avenue Line, and the following day, ten-car express trains were inaugurated on the West Side Line.
In 1918, the Lexington Avenue Line opened north of Grand Central–42nd Street, thereby dividing the original line into an "H"-shaped system. All trains were sent via the Lexington Avenue Line.

Dual Contracts 
After the original IRT opened, the city began planning new lines. The New York Public Service Commission adopted plans for what was known as the Broadway–Lexington Avenue route (later the Broadway Line) on December 31, 1907. A proposed Tri-borough system was adopted in early 1908, incorporating the Broadway Line. Operation of the line was assigned to the Brooklyn Rapid Transit Company (BRT, subsequently the Brooklyn–Manhattan Transit Corporation or BMT) in the Dual Contracts, adopted on March 4, 1913. Because the Dual Contracts specified that the street surfaces needed to remain intact during the system's construction, a temporary web of timber supports was erected to support the streets overhead while the BMT platforms were being constructed. The Broadway Line platforms opened on September 4, 1917, as the northern terminus of the first section of the line between 14th Street and Canal Street. Initially, it only served local trains. On January 5, 1918, the Broadway Line was extended north to Times Square–42nd Street and south to Rector Street, and express service started on the line.

The Dual Contracts also called for the construction of a subway under 14th Street, to run to Canarsie in Brooklyn; this became the BMT's Canarsie Line. Booth and Flinn was awarded the contract to construct the line on January 13, 1916. Clifford Milburn Holland served as the engineer-in-charge during the construction. The Canarsie Line station at Union Square opened on June 30, 1924, as part of the 14th Street–Eastern Line, which ran from Sixth Avenue under the East River and through Williamsburg to Montrose and Bushwick Avenues. A passageway between the Broadway and Canarsie Line stations was completed in late 1923.

Later years 
The city government took over the BMT's operations on June 1, 1940, and the IRT's operations on June 12, 1940. In September 1945, the New York City Club presented a proposal for improving service on the IRT Lexington Avenue Line. The 14th Street–Union Square station on the IRT line would have been relocated about  northward, requiring the closure of the 18th Street station. Since the plan entailed having local trains terminate at 14th Street instead of at City Hall, the local platforms would be rebuilt at a lower level, with a crossover next to the station. In addition, all local trains would be lengthened from six to ten cars.

The transfer between the IRT and BMT was placed inside fare control on July 1, 1948. The Broadway Line station was overhauled in the late 1970s. The MTA replaced the original wall tiles, old signs, and incandescent lighting with the 1970s wall tile band and tablet mosaics, signs and fluorescent lights. They also fixed staircases and platform edges.

By 1982, the entrances in the southern portion of Union Square were to be renovated as part of a refurbishment of Union Square Park. This work was performed over the latter half of that decade, with the entrances having been renovated by 1985. In the late 1980s, the 14th Street–Union Square station was renovated as part of the construction of the Zeckendorf Towers immediately east of the Lexington Avenue Line platforms. The towers' developers agreed to build and maintain subway entrances within the Zeckendorf Towers as "a public benefit", and in exchange, were allowed to develop the site. This was because of zoning rules that required many developers in Lower Manhattan, Midtown Manhattan, and Downtown Brooklyn to relocate and maintain subway entrances that were formerly on the street. The New York City Department of City Planning prepared zoning guidelines for the Union Square area, which would allow a greater maximum floor area ratio in exchange for subway improvements, particularly benefiting the Zeckendorf project.

On August 28, 1991, an accident just north of the IRT station killed five riders and injured 215 others in one of the deadliest accidents in New York City Subway history. The operator of a southbound 4 train was to be shifted to the local track due to repair work on the express one. Five cars were damaged heavily, being scrapped on site, and the track infrastructure suffered heavy structural damage as a result. The entire infrastructure, including signals, switches, track, roadbed, cabling, and 23 support columns needed to be replaced. The derailment occurred at the entry to a former pocket track on the Lexington Avenue Line station, which was removed when the damage from the 1991 wreck was repaired.

In the 1990s, the station underwent a major renovation. On July 9, 1993, the contract for the project's design was awarded for $2,993,948. As part of the contract, the consultant investigated whether it was feasible to reconfigure the IRT passageway, to reframe the exit structure on the Lexington Avenue platforms to accommodate the relocation and widening of stairs, the construction of a new fan room, the removal of stairs on the Broadway Line platforms, the reframing of the existing structure, and the construction of a new staircase between the intermediate and IRT mezzanines. These were all deemed feasible, and in May 1994, a supplemental agreement worth $984,998 was reached to allow the consultant to prepare the design for this work. Plans were prepared by Lee Harris Pomeroy. The project was to cost $38.5 million and start in December 1994, with a new entrance pavilion on the southeast corner of Union Square Park, containing an elevator entrance. The same year, a New York City Transit Police station opened in the Broadway Line mezzanine. A construction contract was ultimately signed in March 1995. The work involved creating a pocket park in a traffic island at the southeast corner of Union Square, a project that was completed in 2000. In addition, power infrastructure had to be upgraded to allow the construction of MetroCard vending machine equipment. In 2002, the Broadway Line station was upgraded for ADA-accessibility and its original late 1910s tiling was restored. As part of the upgrade, the MTA repaired the staircases, re-tiled for the walls and floors, upgraded the station's lights and the public address system, installed yellow safety treads along the platform edge, new signs, and new trackbeds in both directions.

As part of the 2015–2019 MTA Capital Program and the L Project, several modifications were implemented on the platform to improve circulation and to reduce crowding. The stairs from the Broadway Line platforms were rebuilt in March 2019; the stair from the downtown Broadway Line platform was reconfigured entirely. Additionally, a new escalator was installed from the east mezzanine to the platform; it cost around $15 million and opened on September 10, 2020.

Station layout 

The IRT Lexington Avenue Line and BMT Broadway Line stations run roughly parallel to each other in a north–south direction. The Lexington Avenue Line platforms run under Fourth Avenue and Union Square East, while the Broadway Line platforms to the west run under Broadway, cutting directly under Union Square Park. The BMT Canarsie Line station runs west–east under both of the other stations, along 14th Street.

A  mezzanine stretches above the BMT Broadway Line platforms, ramping down to a control area at its south end, where there are stairs down to the Broadway Line platforms and transfers to the other platforms. Along the mezzanine and adjacent passageways, the tops of the walls contain friezes made of raised geometric patterns on the rectangular tiles. White-on-green tiles with the number "14" are placed at the tops of the walls at regular intervals, while white-on-green "Union Square" tablets are installed below the friezes. Rectangular red metal frames also surround sections of the original wall. Imprinted on the walls are over 3,000 stickers with the names of victims of the September 11 attacks, which were put up by artist John Lin and sixteen friends on September 10, 2002. The stickers were not sanctioned by the subway system's operator, the Metropolitan Transportation Authority, and have deteriorated since they were placed.

Directly east of the control area at the south end of the BMT Broadway Line mezzanine, a  corridor slopes down to the IRT mezzanine. The IRT mezzanine contains two overpasses, connecting the station complex with exits on the east side of both Fourth Avenue and Union Square East. Galleries extend from the overpasses above the platforms, with stairs leading downward from the galleries to each island platform. A corridor runs above the western side of the IRT station, connecting the two overpasses. This corridor contains restored cross-segments of the original station wall, including faience cornices, mosaic tile borders, and plaques of eagles. These are part of a larger, station-wide art installation entitled Framing Union Square, by Mary Miss. Original faience plaques with the number "14" are in the southern end of the mezzanine, near one of the entrances. Other decorations, such as a pale blue frieze, date from later renovations. The area near the Zeckendorf Towers contains storefronts, as well as steel and glass enclosures.

Another staircase extends from the IRT mezzanine to a small mezzanine above the Canarsie Line platform. Another mezzanine on the western side of the station serves the Canarsie Line platform directly. There were several connecting passageways between the western Canarsie Line mezzanine and the larger concourse area above the Broadway Line. However, these passageways have been sealed off. The passageways to the Canarsie Line platform contain cruciform borders similar to those in the other passageways.

Exits 

The station contains numerous entrances and exits. Near the southeast end of the station, there is one stair, escalator bank, and elevator in the Zeckendorf Towers at the northeast corner of 4th Avenue and 14th Street; this is the ADA-accessible entrance to the station. There are two stairs to each of the southwest and southeast corners of the same intersection. All of these lead directly to the Lexington Avenue Line mezzanine. One block to the west, there are two staircases on the south side of 14th Street between Broadway and University Place, which lead to the western Canarsie Line mezzanine. A closed exit extended to the west side of Broadway between 13th and 14th Streets.

The central portion of the station contains another exit from the Lexington Avenue Line mezzanine to the Zeckendorf Towers, which leads to the southeast corner of Union Square East and 15th Street. There are also two stairs inside Union Square Park between 14th and 15th Streets. One is closer to Union Square West between these two streets, opposite the equestrian statue of George Washington, while the other is closer to Union Square East and 15th Street. These entrances more directly serve the Broadway Line platforms. The Union Square Park entrances contain large polygonal metal-and-glass canopies, which date from a 1985 renovation of the park.

At the northern end of the station, two stairs rise to Union Square Park on the east side of Union Square West at 16th Street. These lead most directly to the Broadway Line platforms.

IRT Lexington Avenue Line platforms 

The 14th Street–Union Square station is an express station on the IRT Lexington Avenue Line. The 4 and 6 trains stop here at all times; the 5 train stops here at all times except late nights; and the  train stops here during weekdays in the peak direction. The station has four tracks and two island platforms. The uptown and downtown platforms are offset from each other, having been extended at their rear ends, and are slightly curved. Platform gap fillers, on the downtown side, use proximity sensors to detect when trains arrive, automatically extending when a train has stopped in the station.

The island platforms allow for cross-platform interchanges between local and express trains heading in the same direction. Local trains use the outer tracks while express trains use the inner tracks.

The station has two abandoned local side platforms; the northbound platform is visible through windows, bordered with wide, bright red frames.  A combination of island and side platforms was also used at Brooklyn Bridge–City Hall on the IRT Lexington Avenue Line and 96th Street on the IRT Broadway–Seventh Avenue Line. These side platforms were built to accommodate extra passenger volume and were built to the five-car length of the original IRT local trains. When trains were lengthened, the side platforms were deemed obsolete, and they were closed and walled off.

Design 

As with other stations built as part of the original IRT, the station was constructed using a cut-and-cover method. The tunnel is covered by a "U"-shaped trough that contains utility pipes and wires. Each platform consists of  concrete slabs, beneath which are drainage basins. The platforms contain I-beam columns spaced every . Additional columns between the tracks, spaced every , support the jack-arched concrete station roofs. There is a  gap between the trough wall and the platform walls, which are made of -thick brick covered over by a tiled finish.

The walls near the tracks do not have any identifying motifs with the station's name, as all station identification signs are on the platforms. The trackside walls contain vertical white glass tiles. The original decorative scheme for the side platforms consisted of blue tile station-name tablets, blue and buff tile bands, a yellow faience cornice, and blue faience plaques. The mosaic tiles at all original IRT stations were manufactured by the American Encaustic Tile Company, which subcontracted the installations at each station. The decorative work was performed by faience contractor Grueby Faience Company.

Track layout 
Similar to 72nd Street on the IRT Broadway–Seventh Avenue Line, this station was built with extra tracks on the approach to the station. The idea was to have a "stacking" track where a train could be held momentarily until the platform cleared for it to enter the station. The tracks here and at 72nd Street were rendered useless when train lengths grew beyond these tracks' capacity. The northern track was removed as a result of the 1991 derailment. A similar track still exists between the northbound tracks south of the 14th Street–Union Square station's northbound platform.

BMT Broadway Line platforms 

The 14th Street–Union Square station is an express station on the BMT Broadway Line that has four tracks and two island platforms. The N and Q trains stop here at all times. The R stops here at all times except late nights, while the W stops here during weekdays. At the southern end of each platform, three stairs and an elevator lead to the mezzanine, and one stair leads to the Canarsie Line platforms. At the northern end of each platform, two stairs lead to the mezzanine.

The tunnel is covered by a "U"-shaped trough that contains utility pipes and wires. Each platform consists of  concrete slabs, beneath which are drainage basins. The platforms contain I-beam columns spaced every . Additional columns between the tracks, spaced every , support the jack-arched concrete station roofs. The trackside walls also contain exposed I-beam columns, dividing the trackside walls into 5-foot-wide panels.

The panels on the trackside walls consist of white square ceramic tiles. A frieze with multicolored geometric patterns runs atop the trackside walls, with a square mosaic tile placed inside the frieze at intervals of three panels. A band of narrow green tiles runs along the left and right edges of each white-tiled panel, as well as below the frieze and mosaic tiles. The mosaic tiles, by Jay Van Everen, are part of a work entitled "The junction of Broadway and Bowery Road, 1828", a reference to the two streets that intersected at Union Square. In 2005, an artwork called City Glow by Chiho Aoshima was installed here.

BMT Canarsie Line platform 

The Union Square station (announced as 14th Street–Union Square on rolling stock) on the BMT Canarsie Line has two tracks and one island platform. The L train stops here at all times. Various stairs and an elevator go up from the platform to the mezzanine. There are also two stairs leading directly to each of the Broadway Line platforms. An escalator leads directly from the Canarsie Line platform to the IRT mezzanine.

The tunnel is covered by a "U"-shaped trough that contains utility pipes and wires. The platform consists of  concrete slabs, beneath which are drainage basins. The platform contains I-beam columns spaced every . The trackside walls also contain exposed I-beam columns, dividing the trackside walls into 5-foot-wide panels.

The panels on the trackside walls consist of white square ceramic tiles. A band of narrow green tiles runs along the left, right, and top edges of each white-tiled panel. A frieze with multicolored geometric patterns runs atop the trackside walls, with a hexagonal mosaic tile with the letter "U" placed inside the frieze at intervals of three panels.

References

Further reading

External links 
 
nycsubway.org:
 
 
 
 nycsubway.org – Framing Union Square Artwork by Mary Miss (1998) 
 nycsubway.org – Paradise Artwork by Chiho Aoshima (2005) 
 nycsubway.org – City Glow Artwork by Chiho Aoshima (2005) 

Google Maps Street View:

 14th Street and Broadway entrance to Canarsie Line
 14th Street and Fourth Avenue entrance 
 Entrance by Union Square East 
 Union Square East and 15th Street entrance 
 Entrance in Union Square Park 
 Union Square West and 16th Street entrance
 Broadway Line platforms
 Canarsie Line platform
 IRT uptown platform
 Mezzanine

Other websites:
 Station Reporter – 14th Street–Union Square Complex
 Forgotten NY – Original 28 – NYC's First 28 Subway Stations 
 MTA's Arts For Transit – 14th Street–Union Square
 Abandoned Stations – Abandoned Stations – 14th Street side platforms 

IRT Lexington Avenue Line stations
BMT Broadway Line stations
Broadway (Manhattan)
BMT Canarsie Line stations
New York City Subway transfer stations
Railway and subway stations on the National Register of Historic Places in Manhattan
New York City Subway stations in Manhattan

Railway stations in the United States opened in 1948
1948 establishments in New York City
14th Street (Manhattan)
Union Square, Manhattan